The Walsh Jesuit Ironman is an American amateur wrestling tournament.

It is widely considered one of the top three in-season high school wrestling tournaments in the United States, along with the Beast of the East and the Powerade Wrestling Tournament.

References

External links
 Official site

Scholastic wrestling
Wrestling competitions in the United States